Mena is the second studio album by Chilean recording artist Javiera Mena. It was officially released worldwide on September 1, 2010 via iTunes, and on September 15, 2010 physically through indie label Unión del Sur, as a follow up to her successful debut, Esquemas Juveniles (2006). Javiera wrote and all the songs, as well as being the co-producer of every track in the album along with Cristián Heyne. Production first took place in early 2008 and recording sessions at Heyne's personal studio. A couple of months before the album's release, its first single "Hasta la Verdad" was sent to radio stations.

The music of Mena is rooted in the synthpop, electropop and dance-pop-oriented styles, a lot more than in her previous album. Mena also draws inspiration from the pop and electronic music of the 1990s.

At the end of 2010, iTunes Mexico named Mena "the breakthrough album that year".

Track listing

Critical reception
The album was highly acclaimed in the Latin music critic community, earning the first (and, to date, only) perfect 100 rating at Club Fonograma, (however, Juana Molina's Un día had already achieved a five-star rating in 2008) and was later named the site's #1 album of 2010. The track "Luz de Piedra de Luna" was also named the site's single of the year for 2010. Mena also received a 4/5 rating from dance music website Resident Advisor, describing the album as an "aural cocktail volatile by nature, but stable and powerful in its finished form," and called the record's sound as "dance-pop for lovers".

Personnel
Javiera Mena – Production, composition and arrangements, programming, synthesizers, guitar
Cristián Heyne – Recording, mixing, programming, guitar, synthesizers
Jim Brick – Mastering
Pablo Bello – Strings recording
Kelley Polar – Strings arrangement, strings recording
Lara Pedrosa – Bass, backing vocals
José Miguel Tobar – Strings arrangement
Diego Morales – Programming
Andrés Silva – Hihat, percussion
Lido Pimienta – additional vocals
Daniel Hunt – Synthesizers, sound treatment
Jens Lekman – vocals
Rod – Cover/artwork photography
Alejandro Ros – Design

References

2010 albums
Javiera Mena albums
Spanish-language albums